Syria competed at the 2012 Summer Olympics in London, from 27 July to 12 August 2012. This was the nation's twelfth appearance at the Olympics since its debut in 1948. The Syrian Olympic Committee sent the nation's largest delegation to the Games, after the 1988 Summer Olympics in Seoul. A total of ten athletes, six men and four women, competed in 6 sports. Four of them received their spots in track and field, and in swimming by wild card entries. Three Syrian athletes had competed in Beijing, including high jumper Majed Aldin Ghazal, who was the nation's flag bearer at the opening ceremony. Among the sports played by the athletes, Syria marked its Olympic debut in equestrian show jumping.

Because of an ongoing 2011-2012 uprising in Syria (now turned into a civil war), there were concerns about Syria's participation to the Olympic games. General Mowaffak Joumaa, president of Syrian National Olympic Committee, told ITV News: "There is no question about it—we are taking part". In April 2012, Abdelbasset Saroot, the former Syrian football goalkeeper, said in an interview with ITV News that his nation's athletes did not want to compete in these games because "they don't want to play for a flag that they have no pride or faith in". According to the British prime minister David Cameron, Syrian athletes must take part in the Olympics, but any of the nation's officials covered by a European Union travel ban were not welcome. This was the case for the Syrian Olympic Committee's head General Mowaffak Joumaa, who was denied a visa to travel to the games in an official capacity by the British government. The Syrian team in London refused to comment on the political situation in their homeland; their supporters, however, carried Ba'athist flags and voiced their support for the Syrian government.

Syria did not win any medals at the 2012 Olympics. Their last Olympic medal came in the 2004 Summer Olympics in Athens, where Naser Al Shami won the bronze for heavyweight boxing.

Athletics

Men

Women

* Almouhamad was disqualified on 7 August after failing a drug test for the banned substance methylhexanamine.

Boxing

Syria earned 1 quota in boxing.

Men

Cycling

Road

Equestrian

Syria made its Olympic debut in equestrian events.

Jumping

Shooting

Women

Swimming

Syria received two "Universality places" from the FINA.

Men

Women

Weightlifting

Syria qualified the following quota places.

References

Nations at the 2012 Summer Olympics
2012
Summer Olympics